Alicia Vikander is a Swedish actress who made her feature film debut in the 2010 drama Pure, starring as a high school dropout determined to carve out a new identity to escape her difficult upbringing. For her performance in the film she received the Guldbagge Award for Best Actress in a Leading Role, and in 2011 she received the Shooting Stars Award from the Berlin International Film Festival. The following year, she played Caroline Matilda of Great Britain in Danish historical drama A Royal Affair with Mads Mikkelsen, for which she was nominated in the Best Actress category at both the Bodil Awards and Robert Award, and she made her English language debut playing Kitty in the 2012 film adaptation of Tolstoy's Anna Karenina—the role brought her international recognition.

Vikander starred as wartime nurse Vera Brittain in the 2014 drama Testament of Youth, for which she was nominated at the British Independent Film Awards. In 2015 she received awards in the Best Supporting Actress category from the Chicago Film Critics Association, Los Angeles Film Critics Association, Toronto Film Critics Association, and Vancouver Film Critics Circle for her portrayal of an android in psychological thriller Ex Machina. In the same year, she portrayed Danish painter Gerda Wegener, the wife of transgender pioneer Lili Elbe, in The Danish Girl, for which she received the Academy Award for Best Supporting Actress, Screen Actors Guild Award for Outstanding Performance by a Female Actor in a Supporting Role, and the Critics' Choice Movie Award for Best Supporting Actress.

Awards and nominations

Notes

References

External links
 

Lists of awards received by actor